In mathematics, the Kostka number Kλμ (depending on two integer partitions λ and μ) is a non-negative integer that is equal to the number of semistandard Young tableaux of shape λ and weight μ.  They were introduced by the mathematician Carl Kostka in his study of symmetric functions.

For example, if λ = (3, 2) and μ = (1, 1, 2, 1), the Kostka number Kλμ counts the number of ways to fill a left-aligned collection of boxes with 3 in the first row and 2 in the second row with 1 copy of the number 1, 1 copy of the number 2, 2 copies of the number 3 and 1 copy of the number 4 such that the entries increase along columns and do not decrease along rows.  The three such tableaux are shown at right, and K(3, 2) (1, 1, 2, 1) = 3.

Examples and special cases
For any partition λ, the Kostka number Kλλ is equal to 1: the unique way to fill the Young diagram of shape λ = (λ1, λ2, ..., λm) with λ1 copies of 1, λ2 copies of 2, and so on, so that the resulting tableau is weakly increasing along rows and strictly increasing along columns is if all the 1s are placed in the first row, all the 2s are placed in the second row, and so on.  (This tableau is sometimes called the Yamanouchi tableau of shape λ.)

The Kostka number Kλμ is positive (i.e., there exist semistandard Young tableaux of shape λ and weight μ) if and only if λ and μ are both partitions of the same integer n and λ is larger than μ in dominance order.

In general, there are no nice formulas known for the Kostka numbers.  However, some special cases are known.  For example, if μ = (1, 1, 1, ..., 1) is the partition whose parts are all 1 then a semistandard Young tableau of weight μ is a standard Young tableau; the number of standard Young tableaux of a given shape λ is given by the hook-length formula.

Properties
An important simple property of Kostka numbers is that Kλμ does not depend on the order of entries of μ. For example, K(3, 2) (1, 1, 2, 1) = K(3, 2) (1, 1, 1, 2). This is not immediately obvious from the definition but can be shown by establishing a bijection between the sets of semistandard Young tableaux of shape λ and weights μ and μ', where μ and μ' differ only by swapping two entries.

Kostka numbers, symmetric functions and representation theory
In addition to the purely combinatorial definition above, they can also be defined as the coefficients that arise when one expresses the Schur polynomial sλ as a linear combination of monomial symmetric functions mμ:

 

where λ and μ are both partitions of n. Alternatively, Schur polynomials can also be expressed as

 

where the sum is over all weak compositions α of n and xα denotes the monomial x1α1⋯xnαn.

Because of the connections between symmetric function theory and representation theory, Kostka numbers also express the decomposition of the permutation module Mμ in terms of the representations Vλ corresponding to the character sλ, i.e.,

 

On the level of representations of the general linear group , the Kostka number Kλμ counts the dimension of the weight space corresponding to μ in the irreducible representation Vλ (where we require μ and λ to have at most n parts).

Examples
The Kostka numbers for partitions of size at most 3 are as follows:
 K(0) (0) = 1 (here (0) represents the empty partition)
 K(1) (1) = 1
 K(2) (2) = K(2) (1,1) = K(1,1) (1,1) = 1, K(1,1) (2) = 0.
 K(3) (3) = K(3) (2,1) = K(3) (1,1,1) = 1
 K(2,1) (3) = 0, K(2,1) (2,1) = 1, K(2,1) (1,1,1) = 2
 K(1,1,1) (3) = K(1,1,1) (2,1) = 0, K(1,1,1) (1,1,1) = 1

These values are exactly the coefficients in the expansions of Schur functions in terms of monomial symmetric functions:
s = m = 1 (indexed by the empty partition)
s1 = m1
s2 = m2 + m11
s11 = m11
s3 = m3 + m21 + m111
s21 = m21 + 2m111
s111 = m111.

 gave tables of these numbers for partitions of numbers up to 8.

Generalizations
Kostka numbers are special values of the 1 or 2 variable Kostka polynomials:

Notes

References

Symmetric functions
Integer sequences